The 20th European Athletics Junior Championships were held between 23 and 26 July 2009 in the Stadion Karađorđe in Novi Sad, Serbia.

Germany topped the medal table with 25 medals overall, including 10 golds, ahead of Russia and Ukraine.

Medal summary

Men

Women

Medal table

References 

Day reports
Minshull, Phil (2009-07-24). Dominating performances highlight - Euro Jnr Champs, Day 1 (Archived 2009-07-27). IAAF. Retrieved on 2009-07-25.
Minshull, Phil (2009-07-25). Lemaitre sets European Junior 100m record - Euro Jnr Champs, Day 2. IAAF. Retrieved on 2009-07-25.
Minshull, Phil (2009-07-26). Storl the star as more championship records fall - Euro Jnr Champs, Day 3 (Archived 2009-07-29). IAAF. Retrieved on 2009-07-27.
Minshull, Phil (2009-07-27). Euro Junior Champs, Final Day . IAAF. Retrieved on 2009-07-27.

External links 
 Results
 Official YouTube channel with video highlights

European Athletics U20 Championships
European Athletics Junior Championships
Athletics U23 Championships
Athletics U23 Championships
2009 in Serbian sport
2009 in youth sport
21st century in Novi Sad
July 2009 sports events in Europe